Col. Sonaram Choudhary (born 1940/41)  (Hindi- कर्नल सोनाराम चौधरी) is an Indian politician, and a member of the Bharatiya Janata Party since 2014. He represented Barmer constituency in Rajasthan, India, in Lok Sabha for Indian National Congress, winning elections in 1996, 1998, 1999. He lost 2004 Lok Sabha elections to BJP's Manavendra Singh. Later, he left Congress and joined Bhartiya Janta Party before 2014 Indian general elections. He was declared candidate of BJP from Barmer instead of veteran BJP leader Jaswant Singh, and won 2014 elections.

Col. Sonaram Chaudhary is considered a strong Jat leader of entire Rajasthan including Marwar.  Col, who was a four-time MP from Barmer Jaisalmer and one-time MLA from Baitu assembly constituency, always has an active role in the Jat politics of Rajasthan.

Education and career
He obtained a B.E. degree from M.B.M. Engineering College, Jodhpur (Rajasthan) and is a Fellow of the Institution of Engineers (F.I.E.). He passed out of the Indian Military Academy in 1966 and was commissioned as Lieutenant in the Indian Army Corps of Engineers into, 55th Engineers Regiment of Bengal Sappers of the Indian Army. He served in the 1971 war on the Eastern Front. He retired from the Army as a full Colonel in 1987.

References

Rajasthani politicians
Bharatiya Janata Party politicians from Rajasthan
Living people
1945 births
India MPs 1996–1997
India MPs 1998–1999
India MPs 1999–2004
India MPs 2014–2019
People from Barmer district
Lok Sabha members from Rajasthan
Members of Parliament from Barmer
Indian National Congress politicians
Rajasthan MLAs 2008–2013